Aleksandr Konstantinovich Fatyushin (1951 — 2003) was a Soviet and Russian film and theater actor. In 1984, he was the Honored Artist of the RSFSR and the winner of the USSR State Prize.

Fatyushin played in more than 40 films. He worked at the Mayakovsky Theatre.

He died April 6, 2003 in his Moscow apartment after complications from pneumonia. The actor was buried on April 9 at the Memory Alley of outstanding athletes and coaches of the Vostryakovskoye Cemetery in Moscow (station number 131).

Filmography
 1974 — Аutumn as Eduard
 1977 — Office Romance as Vera’s husband   (cameo)
 1978 — Cure for Fear as police captain Tikhonov
 1979 — Moscow Does Not Believe in Tears as Sergei Gurin
 1980 — Expectation as  Igor
 1981 — Express on Fire as Alexander Mukhanov
 1985 — The Detached Mission as ensign Kruglov
 1988  — The Life of Klim Samgin as Lyutov
 1990  — Code of Silence as Valentin Silov
 1991 — Wolfhound as Vova
 1991 — Taganka Go on Тanks as Professor, the head physician of the psychiatric hospital
 1994  — Petersburg Secrets as Egor Dmitrievich Beroev
 1999  — Loving in Russian 3: The Governor as Pavlenok
 2001 — Mechanical Suite as Lebedev
 2003 — And In The Morning They Woke Up as shaper

References

External links 
 Biography

Soviet male film actors
Soviet male stage actors
Russian male stage actors
Russian male film actors
Recipients of the USSR State Prize
Russian Academy of Theatre Arts alumni
People from Ryazan
1951 births
2003 deaths
20th-century Russian male actors
21st-century Russian male actors
Honored Artists of the RSFSR
Deaths from pneumonia in Russia